Ishgeh Su may refer to:
 Ishgeh Su, Showt
 Ishgeh Su, Urmia